Datuk Adnan bin Abu Hassan (6 January 1959 – 18 March 2016) was a Malaysian composer and musician. He is considered to be among the top notch individuals developing the Malaysian music industry.

Education
He held a bachelor's degree from the Berklee College of Music in Boston, Massachusetts, USA. He started his career as a lecturer in the Universiti Teknologi Mara.

Career

Soon after the graduation, he became the A&R Director for CBS Records, Managing Director of Happy Records and Suria Records. Soon he became the Director of A&R for both BMG Music and Delima Records.

He was appointed as the Principal and Director of Jam Music Centre, Album Producer and Composer, who is also the Creative Director for Jam/Treeman Corporation. Malaysian popular singers such as Siti Nurhaliza, Fauziah Latiff, Dayang Nurfaizah and Misha Omar were once his apprentices before their rise into popularity. He was the Managing Director of SRD Villa Record.

He is also known for his appearance in the Akademi Fantasia reality singing contest as the vocal coach for the first three seasons.

Achievements
Adnan won the Best Song in the Anugerah Juara Lagu with the song Jerat Percintaan by Siti Nurhaliza, in 1996, and the song Bunga-bunga Cinta by Misha Omar in 2003.

Death
Adnan Abu Hassan died on 18 March 2016 at the age of 57 in the Selayang Hospital  after suffering from a stroke. His body was laid to rest at the Kampung Sungai Ramal Dalam Muslim Cemetery in Kajang, Selangor.

Awards
1986: 6th Malaysia Film Festival - Best Music
1987: 7th Malaysia Film Festival - Best Music Arrangement

Filmography

As composer 
1984: Matinya Seorang Patriot	
1986: Ali Setan	
1989: Ujang	
1989: Anak Sarawak	
1990: Rentak Desa	
1992: Interlud	
1995: Sayang Salmah

As theme song performer 
1989: Anak Sarawak 	
2007: Cinta Yang Satu

References

External links

Akedemi Fantasia Teacher's Profile
Sinema Malaysia
Kedah Born 

1959 births
2016 deaths
Malaysian people of Malay descent
Berklee College of Music alumni
People from Kedah